Concepts of race and sexuality have interacted in various ways in different historical contexts. While partially based on physical similarities within groups, race is understood by scientists to be a social construct rather than a biological reality. Human sexuality involves biological, erotic, physical, emotional, social, or spiritual feelings and behaviors.

The ways in which people perceive the relationship between these two concepts implicitly informs attitudes toward interracial sexual relationships and sexual preferences for particular races expressed by individuals. Racial bias may involve a sexual dimension, which often takes the form of racial fetishism.

Attitudes towards interracial relationships

In the United States before the Civil Rights Era 
After the abolition of slavery in 1865, white Americans showed an increasing fear of racial mixing. The remnants of the racial divide became stronger post-slavery as the concept of whiteness developed. There was a widely held belief that uncontrollable lust threatens the purity of the nation.  This increased white anxiety about interracial sex, and has been described through Montesquieu's climatic theory in his book The Spirit of the Laws, which explains how people from different climates have different temperaments, "The inhabitants of warm countries are, like old men, timorous; the people in cold countries are, like young men, brave." At the time, black women held the "Jezebel" stereotype, which claimed black women often initiated sex outside of marriage and were generally sexually promiscuous. This idea stemmed from the first encounters between European men and African women. As the men were not used to the extremely hot climate, they misinterpreted the women's lack of clothing for vulgarity. Similarly, black men were stereotyped as having a specific lust for white women. This stereotype triggered tensions, implying that white men were having sex with black women because black women were more lustful than white women were, and in turn, black men would lust after white women in the same way that white men would lust after black women.

There are a few potential reasons as to why such strong ideas on interracial sex developed. The Reconstruction Era which followed the Civil War started to disassemble traditional aspects of Southern society. Now, the Southerners who were used to being dominant were no longer legally allowed to run their farms by practicing slavery. Many whites struggled with this reformation and they attempted to get around it by searching for legal loopholes which would have allowed them to continue their practice of exploiting black laborers. Additionally, the white Democrats were not pleased with the outcome of this reformation and white men felt inadequate as a result. This radical reconstruction of the South was deeply unpopular and it slowly unraveled, leading to the introduction of Jim Crow laws. There was an increase in the sense of white dominance and sexual racism among the Southern people.

Generally, tensions heightened after the end of the civil war in 1865, and as a result, the sexual anxiety which existed in the white population intensified. The Ku Klux Klan was formed in 1867, an event which triggered violence and terrorism which targeted the black population. There was an increase in the number of acts of lynch-mob violence in which many black men were falsely accused of committing rape. These acts of violence were not just senseless, they were attempts to preserve 'whiteness' and prevent the blurring of racial distinctions; some racist whites wanted to maintain a system of racial separation and prevent the occurrence of interracial sexual activity. For example, mixed race couples that chose to live together were sought out and lynched by the KKK. The famous case of Emmett Till, who was lynched by two men when he was fourteen years old, shows the extent of the acts of violence which were committed against black people who flirted with white people. Till was lynched because the two men who lynched him believed that he had whistled at a white woman, but in actuality, he had whistled for his own reasons. When Jim Crow laws were eventually overturned, it took years for the court to resolve the numerous acts of discrimination.

Challenges to attitudes 

Sexual racism is presumed to exist in all sexual communities across the globe. The prevalence of interracial couples may demonstrate how attitudes have changed in the last 50 years. A case that received heightened publicity is that of Mildred and Richard Loving. The couple lived in Virginia yet had to marry outside the state due to the anti-miscegenation laws present in nearly half of the US states in 1958. Once married, the pair returned to Virginia, and were both arrested in their home for the infringement of the Racial Integrity Act, and each sentenced to a year in prison, a sentence which was ultimately overturned by the United States Supreme Court. 

Around a similar time, the controversy involving Seretse and Ruth Khama broke out. Seretse was the chief of an eminent Botswanan tribe, and Ruth a British student. The pair married in 1948 but experienced frequent hardships from the onset of the relationship, including Seretse's removal from his tribal responsibilities as chief in Bechuanaland. For nearly 10 years, Seretse and Ruth lived as exiles in Britain, as the government refused to allow Seretse to return to Bechuanaland. Once the couple were allowed to return to Bechuanaland in 1956, they became prominent campaigners for social equality, contributing to Seretse's election as president of the independent Botswana in 1966. Later, they continued campaigning for the legalization of interracial marriage around the globe.

More recent examples portray the increasingly accepting attitudes of the majority to interracial relationships and marriage. In 1999, Jeb Bush was elected as Governor of Florida, accompanied by his wife, Columba, a Mexican woman he met in León who did not speak English when they met. They were one of the first interracial couples to stand in power side by side. Other prominent interracial couples in American politics are Senate minority leader Mitch McConnell and former Secretary of Transportation Elaine Chao, as well as New York City mayor Bill de Blasio and his wife Chirlane McCray. The political success of these couples is seen by some to demonstrate that attitudes toward interracial marriage (at least in the United States) are much more positive and optimistic than in previous decades. Across much of the world, it is ever increasingly the situation that interracial couples can live, marry and have children without prosecution that was previously rife, due to major changes in law along with reductions in discriminatory attitudes.

Sexual preferences 

While discrimination among partners based on perceived racial identity has been asserted by some to be a form of racism, it is generally considered a matter of personal preference. A study by Callander, Newman, and Holts quoted Watts from the Huffington Post, who argued that sexual attraction and racism are not the same:
 This suggests that people find it possible to view larger systemic racial preference as problematic, while viewing racial preferences in romantic or sexual personal relationships as not problematic. Researchers noted that racial preferences in one's own dating life were generally tolerated and that calling them "racist" is not a commonly accepted view.

Heterosexual community

Online dating 

In the last 15 years, online dating has overtaken previously preferred methods of meeting with potential partners, surpassing both the occupational setting and area of residence as chosen locations. This spike is consistent with an increase in access to the internet in homes across the globe, in addition to the number of dating sites available to individuals differing in age, gender, race, sexual orientation and ethnic background. Partner race is the most highly selected preference chosen by users when creating their online profiles, ahead of both educational and religious characteristics. Research has indicated a progressive acceptance of interracial relationships by white individuals. The majority of white Americans are not against interracial relationships and marriage, though these beliefs do not imply that the person in question will pursue an interracial marriage themselves. Currently, fewer than 5% of white Americans wed outside their own race; indeed, less than 46% of white Americans are willing to date an individual of any other race. Overall, African Americans appear to be the most open to interracial relationships, yet are the least preferred partner by other racial groups. However, regardless of stated preferences, racial discrimination still occurs in online dating.

Each group significantly prefers to date intra-racially. Beyond this, in the online dating world, preferences appear to follow a racial hierarchy. White Americans are the least open to interracial dating, and select preferences in the order of Hispanic Americans, Asian Americans and then African American individuals last at 60.5%, 58.5% and 49.4% respectively. African American preferences follow a similar pattern, with the most preferred partner belonging to the Hispanic group (61%), followed by white individuals (59.6%) and then Asian Americans (43.5%). Both Hispanic and Asian Americans prefer to date a white individual (80.3% and 87.3%, respectively), and both are least willing to date African Americans (56.5% and 69.5%). In all significant cases, Hispanic Americans are preferred to Asian Americans, and Asian Americans are significantly preferred over African Americans. Hispanic Americans are less likely to be excluded in online dating partner preferences by whites seeking a partner, as Latinos are often viewed as an ethnic group that is increasingly assimilating more into white American culture.

Another aspect of racial preferences is that women of any race are significantly less likely to date inter-racially than a male of any race. Specifically, Asian men and black men and women face more obstacles to acceptance online. White women are the most likely to only date their own race, with Asian and black men being the most rejected groups by them. The rejection of Asian men was asserted by one author to be due to a hypothetical effeminate portrayal in media. The preference for men of other races remains present even when considering high-earning Asian men with an advanced educational background. Increased education does however influence choices in the other direction, such that a higher level of schooling is associated with more optimistic feelings towards interracial relationships. White men are most likely to exclude black women, as opposed to women of another race. High levels of previous exposure to a variety of racial groups is correlated with decreased racial preferences. Racial preferences in dating are also influenced by the area of residence. Those residing in the south-eastern regions in American states are less likely to have been in an interracial relationship and are less likely to interracially date in the future. People who engaged in regular religious customs at age 12 are also less likely to interracially date. Moreover, those from a Jewish background are significantly more likely to enter an interracial relationship than those from a Protestant background.

A 2015 study of interracial online dating within multiple European countries, analyzing the dating preferences of Europeans, as well as Arabs, Africans, Asians and Hispanics in Diaspora, found that in aggregate all races ranked Europeans as most preferred, followed by Hispanics and Asians as intermediately preferable, then by Arabs and finally Africans as the least preferred. Country-specific results were more variable, with countries with more non-Europeans showing more openness for Europeans to engage in interracial dating, while exceptions resulted in those with tensions between racial groups (such as in cases where tensions existed between Europeans and Arabs due to Arab Anti-Western sentiment and Western Anti-Arab populism) showed a marked decrease in preference for interracial dating between the two. The researchers noted that Arabs tended to have higher same-race preferences in regions with higher Arabic populations, possibly due to more traditional cultural norms on marriage. The researchers did note a portion of the study was influenced by selection bias, as the data gathered may have disproportionately drawn from people already inclined to engage in interracial dating.

Currently, there are websites specifically targeted to different demographic preferences, such that singles can sign up online and focus on one particular partner quality, such as race, religious beliefs or ethnicity. In addition to this, there are online dating services that target race-specific partner choices, and a selection of pages dedicated to interracial dating that allow users to select partners based on age, gender and particularly race. Online dating services experience controversy in this context as debate is cast over whether statements such as "no Asians" or "not attracted to Asians" in user profiles are racist or merely signify individual preferences.

Non-white ethnic minorities, mostly Indians and Asians, who feel they lack dating prospects as a result of their race, sometimes refer to themselves as ricecels, currycels, or more broadly ethnicels, a term related to the incel, who is generally considered to be white. Racial preferences can sometimes considered as a subset of lookism.

LGBT community 

Hoang Tan Nguyen, an Assistant Professor of English and Film Studies at Bryn Mawr College, wrote that Asian men are often feminized and desexualized by both mainstream and LGBT media.  The gay Asian-Canadian author Richard Fung has opined that he believes that while black and Arab men are portrayed as hypersexualized, gay Asian men are portrayed as being desexualized. Again according to Fung, gay Asian men supposedly tend to ignore or display displeasure with races such as Arabs, Blacks, and other Asians but seemingly give sexual acceptance and approval to gay white men. However, gay white men supposedly are more likely than other racial groups to state "No Asians" when seeking partners.

Asian American women also report similar discrimination in lesbian, gay, bisexual (LGB) communities. According to a study by Sung, Szymanski, and Henrichs-Beck (2015), Asian American participants who identified as lesbian or bisexual often reported invisibility, stereotyping, and fetishism in LGB circles and the larger U.S. culture.

Multiple studies in European gay communities have shown, that while many immigrants from the Mediterranean, such as Amazighs, Turks, Greeks, Arabs, Albanians and Romanians tend to be discriminatory towards and avoidant of homosexuals, with many being openly homophobic, they are actively sought after and fetishized as hypermasculine. "Südländer" or "Mediterraneans", as they are called in German subculture, are often explicitly requested, with frequent statements of "Nur Südländer", "Only Mediterraneans" being not too uncommon, though the demand is rarely met.

Racial preferences are also prevalent in gay online dating. Phua and Kaufman (2003) noted that men seeking men online were more likely than men seeking women to look at racial traits.

In a qualitative study conducted by Paul, Ayala, and Choi (2010) with Asian and Pacific Islanders (API), Latino, and African American men seeking men, participants interviewed endorsed racial preference as a common criterion in online dating partner selection.

Racial bias 

A 2015 study on sexual racism among gay and bisexual men found a strong correlation between test subjects' racist attitudes and their stated racial preferences.

Philosopher Amia Srinivasan argued for racialized origins of Western beauty standards in her 2018 essay "Does anyone have the right to sex?", and stated that racial bias can shape sexual desire.

Racial fetishism 

Racial fetishism is sexually fetishizing a person or culture belonging to a specific race or ethnic group.

Theories 
Homi K. Bhabha explains racial fetishism as a version of racist stereotyping, which is woven into colonial discourse and based on multiple/contradictory and splitting beliefs, similar to the disavowal which Freud discusses.  Bhabha defines colonial discourse as that which activates the simultaneous "recognition and disavowal of racial/cultural/historical differences" and whose goal is to define the colonized as 'other', but also as fixed and knowable stereotypes. Racial fetishism involves contradictory belief systems where the 'other' is both demonized and idolized.

The effects of racial fetishism as a form of sexual racism are discussed in research conducted by Plummer. Plummer used qualitative interviews within given focus groups, and found that specific social locations came up as areas in which sexual racism commonly manifests. These mentioned social locations included pornographic media, gay clubs and bars, casual sex encounters as well as romantic relationships. This high prevalence was recorded within Plummer's research to be consequently related to the recorded lower self-esteem, internalized sexual racism, and increased psychological distress in participants of color.

Fetishism can take multiple forms and has branched off to incorporate different races. The theories of naturalist Darwin can offer some observations in regards to why some people might find other races more attractive than their own. Attraction can be viewed as a mechanism for choosing a healthy mate. People's minds have evolved to recognize aspects of other peoples' biology that makes them an appropriate or good mate. This area of theory is called optimal outbreeding hypothesis.

Examples

White women 

Rey Chow argues that the fetishism of white women in Chinese media does not have to do with sex. Chow describes it as a type of commodity fetishism. White women, according to Chow, are seen as a representation of what China does not have: an image of a woman as something more than the heterosexual opposite to man.

Perry Johansson argues that following the globalization of China, the perception of Westerners changed drastically. With the Opening of China to the outside world, representations of Westerners shifted from enemies of China to individuals of great power, money, and pleasure.

In a study of Chinese advertisements from 1990 to 1995, marketed solely to the Chinese people, Johansson concluded that, in China, the racial fetish of Western women does have to do with sex. Chinese advertisements depict Western women as symbols of strength and sexuality. The body language of Chinese models in ads expresses shyness and subordination with canting of heads and bodies, lying down and covering of faces, while the body language of Western women demonstrates power and uninhibited unashamedness. Western women more often hold their heads high, stare straight into the camera, and do not cover their mouths while laughing.  The study suggested Western women represent a shift in the power dynamics between women and men and are even presented with qualities otherwise considered to be "masculine" in Chinese culture.

Asian women 

An Asian fetish focusing on East Asian, Southeast Asian and to some extent South Asian women has been documented in Australasia, North America, and Scandinavia.

According to an article from the Washington and Lee Journal of Civil Rights and Social Justice, the "Asian fetish" syndrome is born out of the male desire for dominance and the stereotype of Asian women as individuals open to domination. For example, following the 1970s and a peak in the American feminist movement, many white men turned to mail-order bride companies in search of a loyal, understanding, and subservient partner. They saw women of their own race as too career-oriented and strong-willed. Asian women were the antithesis to their perception of white women. While white women resisted powerlessness and subjugation to the white man, Asian women were seen as open to the subjugation, even depicted as enjoying it.

The song "Yellow Fever" by The Bloodhound Gang includes lyrics such as, "She's an oriental rug cause I lay her where I please", and "Then I blindfold her with dental floss and get down on her knees." Both of these instances exemplify the stereotype of Asians as submissive. Margaret Cho has labeled Gwen Stefani's Harajuku Girls as a "minstrel show" because they represent fetishized East Asian stereotypes.  The girls follow Stefani around on tour and are contractually obligated not to speak English in public. The performer had "renamed" them corresponding to her album title and clothing brand, L.A.M.B.: Love, Angel, Music, and Baby.

Furthermore, there have been many cases of Asian fetishism leading to criminal activity. In one case in 2000, two men, David Dailey and Edmund Ball, abducted and blindfolded two Japanese women in Washington, one who was eighteen and the other who was nineteen. Ball specifically targeted these Asian students because he thought that they were submissive and were less likely to report sexual abuse. In another case, in 2005, Michael Lohman, a doctoral student at Princeton University, was charged by the state of New Jersey for reckless endangerment, theft, harassment as well as tampering with a food product. Michael had cut locks of hair off at least nine Asian women. He also poured his semen and urine into the drinks of Asian Princeton students more than fifty times. In his apartment, Michael also had mittens filled with hairs of Asian women.

Arab and Middle Eastern women 

According to multiple articles, the West's fetishization of fully covered Arab women has led to the stereotype that Arab women and women from the Muslim world are oppressed and therefore submissive. When French armies invaded Algeria, they had anticipated Algerian women to be sexually available and hookah smokers. To their surprise, Algerian women actually appeared to have been more modestly dressed and covered from their head to toes. Many French photographers paid Algerian women to remove part of their religious attire and pose for photos to make French postcards. In his book Desiring Arabs, Joseph Massad talks about how the West's interpretation of Arab culture has painted the stereotype of Arab women being exotic and desirable. Massad's book was largely influenced by Edward Said's book Orientalism.

Mixed race women/Latin woman 

In her book Sex Tourism in Bahia Ambiguous Entanglements, Erica Lorraine Williams published the first full-length ethnography of sex tourism in Brazil, including interviews with tourists who come solely to participate in sexual tourism, which may be considered a form of racialized fetishism. One of the tourists interviewed described his experience, "I've had a thing for Latin, brown-skinned women since my early twenties. I'm from [a place] where there are a lot of blonde, white girls. Whatever you have, you like the opposite – they're exotic, intriguing."

Black women 

The fetishization of black women expanded during the Colonial Era, as some white male slave owners raped and sexually abused their black, female slaves. They justified their actions by labeling the women as hyper-sexual property. These labels solidified into what is commonly referred to as the "Jezebel" stereotype. The opposite of this "Jezebel" identity or persona is the "Mammy" figure who loses all of her sexual agency and autonomy, and becomes an asexual figure.  L. H. Stallings notes that the creation and identities for the Jezebel or Mammy figures are "dependent upon patriarchy and heterosexuality." An example of racial fetishism within the colonial era is that of Sarah Baartman. Baartman's body was utilized as a means to develop an anatomically accurate representation of a black woman's body juxtaposed to that of a  white European woman's body during the age of biological racism. The scientist studying her anatomy went as far as making a mold of Baartman's genitalia postmortem because she refused him access to examine her vaginal region while she was alive. The data collected on Baartman is the origin of the black female body stereotype, i.e. large buttocks and labia.

Charmaine Nelson suggests that every nude painting feeds into the voyeuristic male gaze, but the way black women are painted has even more undertones. "The black female body defies the white male subject's desire for a single subject of 'pure' origin in two ways: firstly, through a sexual 'otherness' as woman, and secondly through a racial and color 'otherness' as black. It is the combined power of these two markers of social location which has enabled western artists to represent black women at the margins of societal boundaries of propriety." Nelson asserts that any black woman is considered a fetish in these paintings and that she is only viewed in a sexual lens.

One of the more recent popular discourses around the fetishization of black women surrounds the release of Nicki Minaj's popular song, "Anaconda" in 2014. The entire song and music video revolves around the largeness of black women's bottoms. While some praise Minaj's work for its embrace of female sexuality, some criticized that this song continues to reduce black women to be the focus of the male gaze. The 2020 song "WAP" ("Wet-Ass Pussy") by Cardi B and Megan Thee Stallion received a similar mixed reception, with some outlets praising its embrace of black female sexuality and others claiming it was degrading or objectifying women of color.

Black men 

"Big black cock", usually shortened to "BBC", is a sexual slang and genre of ethnic pornography, that focuses on Black men with large penises. The stereotype of larger penis size in black men has been subjected to scientific scrutiny, with inconclusive results. The theme is found in both straight and gay pornography.

In BDSM 

There is also a practice in BDSM which involves fetishizing race called "raceplay". Susanne Schotanus defined raceplay as "a sexual practice where the either imagined or real racial background of one or more of the participants is used to create this power-imbalance in a BDSM-scene, through the use of slurs, narratives and objects laden with racial history." Feminist author Audre Lorde cautions that this kind of BDSM "operates in tandem with social, cultural, economic, and political patterns of domination and submission" creating the perpetuation of negative stereotypes for black women in particular.

However, race play can also be used within BDSM as a curative practice for black individuals to take back their autonomy from a history of subjugation. One BDSM Dominatrix explains that raceplay provides her with an "emotional sense of reparations". "Violence for black female performers in BDSM becomes not just a vehicle of intense pleasure but also a mode of accessing and critiquing power"

See also 

 Afrophobia
 Anti-miscegenation laws
 Discrimination based on skin color
 Discrimination in the United States
 Ethnic pornography
 Gendered racism
 Interracial marriage
 Race and crime
 Racism against African Americans
 Racism in the United States
Sexual capital#Race
 Sexual objectification
 Stereotypes of African Americans
 Stereotypes of groups within the United States

References

Bibliography

Further reading

 
 
 
 
 

Intercultural and interracial relationships
Physical attractiveness
Racism
Sexual attraction
Sexual fetishism